During the 2002–03 English football season, Walsall competed in the Football League First Division. It was the club's second consecutive season at that level.

Season summary
Walsall managed to avoid relegation to extend their stay in English football's second tier to a third season. Much of their success was down to the signing of key players, such as ex-Tottenham Hotspur midfielder Vinny Samways, returning to English football after a six-year spell in Spain.

Kit
Xara became Walsall's new kit manufacturers. Banks's remained the kit sponsors.

Final league table

Results
Walsall's score comes first

Legend

Football League First Division

FA Cup

League Cup

First-team squad
Squad at end of season

Left club during season

Reserve squad

References

Walsall F.C. seasons
Walsall